The Wairere River or Wairere Stream is a river of the Northland Region of New Zealand's North Island. It flows northwest to reach the Waihou River, an arm of the Hokianga Harbour.

See also
List of rivers of New Zealand

References

Far North District
Rivers of the Northland Region
Rivers of New Zealand